George William Richardson (1901–unknown) was an English professional footballer who played as a wing-half.

References

1901 births
Year of death missing
People from the City of Sunderland
Footballers from Tyne and Wear
English footballers
Association football defenders
Burnley F.C. players
Derby County F.C. players
Hartlepool United F.C. players
Newport County A.F.C. players
Aldershot F.C. players
English Football League players
Horden Athletic F.C. players